Jiménez del Teul is the seat of the Jiménez del Teul Municipality in the Mexican state of Zacatecas.  One of the oldest towns in Mexico, Jiménez del Teul was founded in 1591.

References

Populated places in Zacatecas
Populated places established in 1591